In the parliamentary politics of the United Kingdom and Canada, one member, one vote (OMOV) is a method of selecting party leaders, and determining party policy, by a direct vote of the members of a political party. Traditionally, these objectives have been accomplished either by a party conference, party convention, vote of members of parliament, or some form of electoral college. OMOV backers claim that OMOV enhances the practice of democracy, because ordinary citizens will be able to participate. Detractors counter that allowing those unversed in the issues to help make decisions makes for bad governance.

The use of OMOV is placed in date order for each country:

Canada

Parti Québécois
The first OMOV leadership selection process in Canada was held by the Parti Québécois, ending on 29 September 1985.

Manitoba political parties
In English-speaking Canada, the principle of OMOV has for years been a major commitment of Vaughan L. Baird.  Long a proponent of the election process that empowers all members of a party to choose their leaders, Baird was instrumental in having the provincial constituency of Morris, Manitoba successfully put forward the principle of OMOV to the provincial Progressive Conservative Party on 5 November 1985. Immediately after the Morris victory, Baird wrote to every national and provincial party in Canada and urged them to do the same.  Soon after, the Manitoba Liberal Party adopted the principle.  Alberta PCs used the method in electing Ralph Klein as their new leader in December 1992.

The Progressive Conservative Party of Manitoba adopted the process in early 1987, but the party hierarchy later had it revoked. Though again adopted by the party in 1994, OMOV was revoked a second time in November 1995.  Finally, on November 17, 2001, with only three votes in opposition, OMOV was passed by the Progressive Conservative Party of Manitoba.

Alberta Progressive Conservatives
In 1991, the Alberta Progressive Conservatives changed its rules for selecting a party leader, moving from a traditional delegate-based leadership convention to an OMOV system. Four party leaders were chosen using this system: Ralph Klein (1992); Ed Stelmach (2006); Alison Redford (2011); and Jim Prentice (2014). However, the Alberta PC party ended this system in 2016 after OMOV came under criticism.

New Democratic Party
In 1995, the New Democratic Party moved some way towards OMOV when they developed a series of regional primary elections prior to their convention. In the subsequent contest, the party went further adopting a modified OMOV process for the 2003 NDP leadership election in which the vote was calculated so that ballots cast by labour delegates had 25% weight in the total result, while votes cast by all party members on an OMOV had a weight of 75%.  When the federal Liberal government changed the election finances law, soon after Jack Layton won the NDP's leadership in the modified OMOV election on January 23, 2003, the party implemented full OMOV for its next leadership convention. The Ontario NDP does not use full OMOV for its leadership elections -- the Party Constitution (Article 8) provides for a 25% weighting of delegate votes from affiliated unions and locals.

Bloc Québécois
The Bloc Québécois first used OMOV in its 1997 leadership election.

Progressive Conservative Party of Canada
The Progressive Conservative Party of Canada used a weighted OMOV system first used in 1998 for the 1998 Progressive Conservative leadership election, in order to encourage leadership candidates to seek support across the country. In 2003, the party merged with the Canadian Alliance, which itself used a pure OMOV system, to form the Conservative Party of Canada, but it was agreed to retain the weighted system for the new party. Under the weighted system, all ridings are accorded an equal number of points and those points are distributed to candidates proportionately to how party members in that riding vote.

Liberal Party of Canada
In 2009, the Liberal Party of Canada adopted a weighted membership vote in which each riding counts equally in the final tally. This is not a one-member, one-vote system because, by definition, members have a variable number of votes depending on the riding they live in. However, it is similar to one member, one vote in that every party member is entitled to cast a ballot. The 2009 convention was conducted according to the old rules. However, as this convention did not feature a contested race but was a ratification of Michael Ignatieff's leadership, the last example of a full-blown delegated federal leadership convention being the 2006 convention that elected Stéphane Dion.

United Kingdom 
In the United Kingdom, the methods of selecting party leaders gradually developed as parliamentary parties took shape and grew more rigid over time, in some cases many decades after their counterparts elsewhere in the Commonwealth – for example, the Conservative Party did not adopt a formal method for choosing its leaders until 1965. Traditionally, members of Parliament have usually played a major role in selecting party leaders, based largely on the belief that since a leader had to work closely with his or her parliamentary party, their views on who the leader should be had to be paramount. In recent years, all major parties have implemented reforms to allow ordinary party members a say in the choosing of a new leader, while still allowing MPs a central role in the leadership selection process.

Liberal Democrats
The Liberal Democrats are the most longstanding example of a national UK party using the OMOV system for the election of the party's leader and deputy leader. It has been used since the party's foundation in 1988. 

Unlike both the Labour Party Conference and Conservative Party Conference, every member of the Liberal Democrats who attends the twice-per-year Liberal Democrat Conference, in-person or online, has the right to vote on party policy, also under the party's OMOV system.

Rather than having a 'runoff' for leadership contests, the Liberal Democrats use the Alternative Vote system of preference voting. Liberal Democrat MPs have no special voting rights when choosing the leader – however, a prospective candidate must be a sitting Liberal Democrat MP with the support of at least ten percent of the parliamentary party in order to stand in a leadership election.

Labour Party
The Labour Party first successfully introduced a partial OMOV system in 1993, for future elections of the party's leader and Deputy leader, under John Smith. This was achieved by abolishing the party's trade union block vote in the selection of Labour parliamentary candidates, and by giving union members paying the political levy (in the trade union section of Labour's electoral college) a direct vote in the party's leadership elections. Smith introduced the change at the Labour Party Conference in 1993, and was verbally supported in winning votes for it at the Conference by then-Shadow Cabinet member John Prescott. 

This followed earlier attempts to introduce OMOV in 1981 and again in 1984, to replace the secret ballot of Labour MPs. OMOV had first been proposed at Labour's Wembley Special Conference in 1981, but was not adopted, following opposition by Tony Benn, who instead initiated an electoral college comprising different interest groups in the party: a trade union section comprising 40% of the total vote, consisting of block votes cast by union General Secretaries, another section of 30% comprising the Parliamentary Labour Party (Labour MPs) and a further 30% for Constituency Labour Parties (CLPs). The 1984 attempt to introduce OMOV for future elections of the leader and Deputy Leader also failed, after opposition from the trade unions.

Following 1989, party rule changes made it compulsory for CLPs to ballot their members, with the CLP's vote going to only the winning candidate.   

A complete one-member, one-vote voting system for the election of a new leader and deputy leader was introduced in 2014 by Labour leader Ed Miliband. All Labour Party members are now entitled to vote for the Leader and Deputy Leader of the party as part of an electoral college which includes MPs and trade unions.

Labour leader Keir Starmer attempted to remove the one-member one-vote system for future elections of leader and deputy leader, as part of a package of internal electoral reforms at the 2021 Labour Party Conference, but was forced to water down his proposals after widespread opposition.

Conservative Party

In January 1998, the Conservative Party adopted OMOV for future elections of the party's leader. Before the rule change, the leader had been chosen by a secret ballot of Conservative MPs. The OMOV principle was adopted as part of the series of reforms of the Conservative Party. MPs choose two candidates to go to a vote by all Conservative members.

The system was first used by the Conservatives in the 2001 leadership election to replace William Hague. A runoff by various candidates led to Iain Duncan Smith and Kenneth Clarke being put forward to a vote of all Conservative members, where 79% of the 328,000 eligible members voted. Duncan Smith became the new Leader of the Conservative Party with 61% of the votes (155,933 votes). Kenneth Clarke obtained 39% of the votes (100,544 votes).

In the 2003 leadership election no ballot took place, since Michael Howard was unopposed in standing to replace Duncan Smith. The two-candidate runoff was employed again two years later, when David Cameron was chosen by the Conservative members as their new leader over David Davis. Cameron had 134,446 votes compared to Davis’ 64,398 votes, making a total number of 198,844 votes.

See also
 Branch stacking
 One share, one vote, in corporate governance

References 

Political party leadership elections